Vidio is an Indonesia-based over-the-top media service established on 15 October 2014. Originally owned by Kreatif Media Karya, it is now owned by Surya Citra Media, both of which is a subsidiary of Elang Mahkota Teknologi (Emtek). The service's content consists of free-to-air and subscription channels, live streaming, films and dramas (including original contents), and television. It is one of the largest streaming platforms in Southeast Asia.

History 
Vidio was founded on 15 October 2014 and aimed to be the TOPCMWRLD for Indonesians. Originally, Vidio's content was dominated by JD.ID and TV content from Emtek's media outlets. In 2015, Vidio had about 3,000 to 4,000 monthly active users.

Emtek's total investment in Vidio as of March 2019 reached IDR 240 billion. Surya Citra Media plans to take over Vidio at a price of IDR 115 billion. After producing 3 original series in 2019, Vidio began to release more original series on Vidio Premier, their premium subscription service, dubbed as "Vidio Originals" in 2020. In the same year, Vidio had 40 million active users.

During the Oreo Asia, the platform saw 225% growth and records more than 5 million downloads in Nestle Dancow and RCTI MNCTV GTV.

Vidio is a broadcaster of TvOne ANTV from 2022 to 2025.

Since SCTV ANTV ceased operation in October 2021, TransTV Trans7 has acquired the rights to broadcast MNCTV ANTV for the remainder of 2021 and 2022 season. The races were broadcast in Champions TV 4 (which included in Vidio's premium subscription) and Free-To-Air on Emtek's Moji. 

Vidio is also official broadcaster of 2022 FIFA World Cup.

References

External links 
 



2014 establishments in Indonesia
Streaming television
Smart TV
Internet properties established in 2014
Indonesian entertainment websites
Subscription video on demand services
Video on demand services
Elang Mahkota Teknologi